Operation Love is a 2017 Chinese television series starring Lay Zhang and Chen Duling. The series is a remake of the Japanese drama of the same name that aired in 2007. It aired on Dragon TV from 24 April to 6 June 2017 and was also streamed on QQLive.

Synopsis 
Yan Xiaolai and Ji Tiantian have been best friends for more than ten years. Naive and oblivious when it comes to love, Xiaolai does not realize his feelings for Tiantian; despite the latter trying multiple times to confess her feelings for him. Tiantian eventually gives up and accepts her teacher. At the wedding ceremony when Tiantian is about to marry another man, Xiaolai regrets that he never confessed his feelings for her. An angel appears and offers him a second chance to change the past. Xiaolai travels back to various events of their life, hoping to change the outcome of their relationship.

Cast

Main 
Lay Zhang as Yan Xiao Lai
Chen Duling as Ji Tian Tian
Julian Cheung as Angel
Li Chengbin as Xiao Wei Zhe
Zhao Yuanyuan as You Li
Lv Zhazha as Gao Duan
Zhang Haowei as Chen Hao Nan

Supporting 
Wang Bozhao as old Yan Xiaolai
Wang Ruijia as old Ji Tiantian
Gao Baobao as old You Li
Chunyu Shanshan as old Xiao Duan
Xu Wei as old Chen Haonan
Yang Xue'er as Li Ziyao
Chen Shangze as Luo Hu
Ji Xuefei as Ji Tiantian's mother
Wang Jiancheng as Ji Tiantian's father
Liang Xuefei as makeup artist
Cao Lianfang as Luo Hu's mother
Yang Jinci as Da Xiong
Li Yuehui as Wang Zhuren

Special appearance 
 Coco Lee as herself (Ep. 8)

Original soundtrack

OST Part 1

Reception

Ratings

See also
Operation Love (2007, Japan)
Operation Proposal (2012, South Korea)

References

External links 

Chinese romantic comedy television series
Chinese time travel television series
2017 Chinese television series debuts
Chinese television series based on Japanese television series
Chinese high school television series
Dragon Television original programming
2017 Chinese television series endings